The Kizhakke Kotta, commonly known as East Fort, is a busy commercial street located at the heart of the central business district of Thiruvananthapuram city the capital of Kerala. East Fort is known as the heart of the city as it is located in the center. Since Trivandrum was known as Travancore, East Fort was a commercial suburb with the presence of the Padmanabhaswamy Temple since 1900. East Fort also stands up as the second largest shopping area after the posh shopping area of Pulimoodu (MG Road).

History

East Fort got its name from the eastern entrance to the fort built by the Kings of Travancore. The old city was all inside the fort on four sides with the Sri Padmanabha Swamy temple at the center. It is said that there were huge metal gates on this entrance to the Fort which was decorated with the symbol of a conch, which was the insignia of the Royal Family of Travancore.

Significance

East Fort or Kizhakke Kotta, as it is known in Malayalam, is today the heart of Thiruvananthapuram city. It is the central bus depot for the city bus services run by the state-run KSRTC and KURTC. It is linked by MG Road to rest of downtown Thiruvananthapuram, and is the point of diversion to other parts of the city, as well as the famed Kovalam beach. The city's Central railway station, as well as the Central Bus Stand (for long distance buses) are both a few minute walk from East Fort, so are most of Thiruvananthapuram's cinemas, as well as top cultural venues and shopping malls. Sri Padmanabha Swami Temple, from which the city takes its name (Thiru Anantha Puram means 'the city or puram of Holy (Thiru) Anantha, another name for Vishnu, who is the deity of Sri Padmanabha Swamy Temple), is situated inside the East fort entrance.

Another important landmark is the 125-year-old Attakulangara Government Central High School which was established in the year 1889 by the then social activist Marthandan Thampi during the reign of Ayilyam Tirunal situated near Gandhi park. This school is the Alma Mater of many famous persons who are scattered around the globe.  On its list of former teachers are poet Ulloor S. Parameswara Iyer, former Chief Minister Pattom A. Thanu Pillai (chemistry), social reformer Sahodaran Ayyappan, former Chief Justice of erstwhile Travancore, U. Padmanabha Kukkiliya, Swami Vedachalam (Tamil), Marai Malai Adigal, and so on. Its alumni includes Subramanian who secured first rank in the SSLC in 1971 and also former Minister M.M. Hassan. 
 
East Fort during the past few decades has transformed itself into one of the biggest commercial hubs of trivandrum with majority of Branded Jewellery showrooms like Alukkas, Alappat, Josco, Prince, Kalyan having their shops inside the fort premise. The 450 meters long street facing East FOrt and Padmanabha Swamy temple is the most expensive stretch of land in Trivandrum with most of the land being owned by Rajadhani Group and Ramachandran Textiles group. There are temples devoted to Hanuman, Ganesh inside the east fort premise along with an Ashram started by Shri Abhedananda. The major landmarks include Govt offices like Taluk office, RTO office, Pattom Tanu Pillai Park, Sanskrit school, Attukal Shopping Complex, Saj Lucia, Karimpanal Arcade . There are many palaces within the fort premise like Kuthira malika, Ranga vilasom Palace which is now a photo gallery. There is also institutions like District Co operative bank, Vasu Deva Vilasom Vaidyasala along with all the above-mentioned places.
   
Kuthiramalika Palace museum, built by His Highness Swathi Thirunal Rama Varma, Maharaja of erstwhile Travancore is also situated inside the Fort complex and its remains.

Gandhi Park is situated in front of the fort, which is famous for hosting socio-politico gatherings. Gandhi Park has been completely remodelled with modern urban landscaping, and is a common spot for a relaxing stroll or time-out. The Gandhi Park provides a view of the entrance to the East Fort which is lit up. The archeological department, cognizant of the great and long heritage of the East Fort, undertakes the maintenance and upkeep of the East Fort. It is a national monument and is flood lit in the evenings. The East Fort has its own Police Station and Post Office. This place of the city is said to be the very heart of Trivandrum, and used to be the centre of administration, arts, and literature as Sri Bala Rama Varma was the patron of this city who himself was a virtuoso and a connoisseur at these fields.

The Ganesha temple, Pazhavangadi Ganapathi Temple, is also situated at the East Fort.

It is from the East Fort that one enters the Chalai Bazaar (Market), which was the main business center of  Travancore. Gold, Flowers, Iron and Steel, Fruits and Vegetables to Cars and Computers, this is one spot where you get everything. The beauty of this place and its surroundings is so amazing that it is always swarmed by thousands of tourists daily. The place is so ancient that you can see houses of old era, agraharams - Brahmin homes, and lot more. One of the oldest market in the state Chala market is opposite to east fort and you can get anything under the sun from that market place. There is Putharikandom maithanam that hosts political rallies and speeches which also lies opposite to east fort and is alongside the KSRTC depot. Numerous cinemas like Padmanabha theater, Ajantha Theater, Sree bala (it is closed permanently), Kripa, SL Theater complex are also close by. All in all it is the ultimate Central Business hub of the capital city of Kerala with astounding real estate  and heritage value

Transport

Road
Being in the Central Business District of Trivandrum, East Fort is connected to the MG Road connecting it to Palayam,Thiruvananthapuram. It is connected to the Eanchakkal-Chalai Road connecting the Chackai Flyover and Airport

Railways
East fort is very close to Thycaud another commercial suburb which contains Thiruvananthapuram Central.

Public Transport
East Fort has a large bus stop having buses from most parts of Trivandrum District and City. After Trivandrum Metro completion East Fort will also get connected to Technocity, Trivandrum.

Places of interest

Sri Padmanabha Swami Temple and Padmatheerthakkulam - 200 m
Pazhavangadi Ganapathi temple - 250 m
Chalai bazaar - 100 m
Kuthira Malika - 150 m
Abhedananda Ashram - 200 m
Ramachandran Textiles - 100 m

References

Kingdom of Travancore
Suburbs of Thiruvananthapuram
Forts in Kerala